Brent Billingsley (born April 19, 1975) is a former Major League Baseball relief pitcher. Billingsley played for the Florida Marlins in the  season, appearing in eight games for a total of 7.2 innings pitched. He bats and throws left-handed.

Billingsley was drafted by the Marlins in the 5th round of the 1996 MLB amateur draft out of Cal State Fullerton, having transferred there from East Carolina University.

References

External links 

1975 births
Baseball players from California
Cal State Fullerton Titans baseball players
Florida Marlins players
Living people
Newark Bears players
Sportspeople from Downey, California